Uncial 0264 (in the Gregory-Aland numbering), is a Greek uncial manuscript of the New Testament. Paleographically it has been assigned to the 5th century.

Descriptions 
The codex contains small parts of the Gospel of John 8:19-20,23-24, on one parchment leaf (15 cm by 12 cm). It has survived in a fragmentary condition. The text is written in one column per page, 18 lines per page, in uncial letters.

Currently it is dated by the INTF to the 5th century.

Location 
Currently the codex is housed at the Berlin State Museums (P. 14049) in Berlin.

Text 
The text-type of this codex is unknown, as the text is too brief to determine its textual character. Aland did not place it in any of Categories of New Testament manuscripts.

See also 

 List of New Testament uncials
 Textual criticism

References

Further reading 

 Kurt Treu, "Neue Neutestamentliche Fragmente der Berliner Papyrussammlung", APF 18 (Berlin: 1966), pp. 23-38.
 G. H. R. Horseley, "New Documents Illustrating Early Christianity" 2 (Macquarie University, 1982), pp. 125-140.
 U. B. Schmid, D. C. Parker, W. J. Elliott, The Gospel according to St. John: The majuscules (Brill 2007), pp. 146-149. [text of the codex]

Greek New Testament uncials
5th-century biblical manuscripts